Vinny Saponari (born February 15, 1990) is an American professional ice hockey right winger who is currently plays for Augsburger Panther of the Deutsche Eishockey Liga (DEL).

Playing career
Saponari was drafted 94th overall by the Atlanta Thrashers in the 2008 NHL Entry Draft from the USA Hockey National Team Development Program. After his draft selection, Saponari began playing for Boston University but was dismissed in 2010 along with his brother Victor. Following this, he spent a season in the United States Hockey League for the Dubuque Fighting Saints before returning to college hockey with two seasons at Northeastern University.

Saponari signed with the St. John's IceCaps of the American Hockey League at the tail-end of the 2012–13 season, playing in seven regular season games and scoring a goal and an assist. He signed with the Milwaukee Admirals of the AHL for the 2013–14 season in what would be his only consistent season in the league, playing fifty-eight games and scoring thirty-three points. Afterwards, he played predominantly in the ECHL over the next two seasons and only made brief appearances in the AHL for the Hartford Wolf Pack, Portland Pirates and the Lake Erie Monsters before returning to the Admirals for a brief spell there as well.

On September 10, 2016, Saponari left North America and signed for Frisk Asker of Norway's GET-ligaen. On May 15, 2017, he moved to the Czech Republic and signed for HC Sparta Praha of the Czech Extraliga, but only played fifteen games for the team before returning to Frisk Asker on December 3, 2017, for the remainder of the season. On July 22, 2018, Saponari signed with the Krefeld Pinguine of the Deutsche Eishockey Liga.

In the midst of his third season with Krefeld Pinguine in 2020–21, Saponari registered just 2 assists through 8 regular season contests before opting to mutually terminate his contract on February 1, 2021.

On June 1, 2021, Saponari returned to the DEL, signing a one-year deal with Augsburger Panther.

References

External links

1990 births
American men's ice hockey right wingers
Atlanta Thrashers draft picks
Augsburger Panther players
Boston University Terriers men's ice hockey players
Cincinnati Cyclones (ECHL) players
Dubuque Fighting Saints players
Frisk Asker Ishockey players
Greenville Road Warriors players
Greenville Swamp Rabbits players
Hartford Wolf Pack players
HC Sparta Praha players
Kassel Huskies players
Krefeld Pinguine players
Lake Erie Monsters players
Living people
Milwaukee Admirals players
Northeastern Huskies men's ice hockey players
Portland Pirates players
St. John's IceCaps players